The Court Clerk's Office-County & Circuit, on East Court St. in Greensburg, Kentucky, was built in 1818.  It was listed on the National Register of Historic Places in 1987.

It is Federal in style, and was built of dry stone construction, the best building method available during Kentucky's settlement period.  The building served as the clerk's office until 1842.  After 1877 it was the home of "Aunt Eunice", a former slave.  The building was later bought and repaired by the City of Greensburg.

References

National Register of Historic Places in Green County, Kentucky
Federal architecture in Kentucky
Government buildings completed in 1818
1818 establishments in Kentucky
County government buildings in Kentucky
Government buildings on the National Register of Historic Places in Kentucky
Greensburg, Kentucky